Bryce Washington may refer to:

Bryce Washington (basketball) (born 1996), American basketball player
Bryce Washington (soccer) (born 1998), American soccer player